This timeline lists important events in the life and work of Huldrych Zwingli. His timeline is compared to important events in the life and work of his contemporary, Martin Luther, as well as other historical events.

Timeline

See also
Reformation in Switzerland

Huldrych Zwingli